Clemente Cerdeira Fernández (1887–1947) was a Spanish Arabist and diplomat.

1887 births
1947 deaths
Spanish diplomats